Chris Vincent Cariaso (born May 27, 1981) is a retired Filipino-American mixed martial artist who competed as a Flyweight in the Ultimate Fighting Championship.

Personal
Cariaso is of Filipino descent.

Mixed martial arts career
Since turning professional in 2006, Cariaso has competed in several organizations, obtaining wins in large MMA promotions such as Strikeforce and EliteXC, with all of his fights taking place in his native Northern California.

ISCF - International Sport Combat Federation
Cariaso won the ISCF Bantamweight Title on October 24, 2009 when he defeated Rolando Velasco by TKO at 3:17 of round 2 due to strikes.

World Extreme Cagefighting
Cariaso made his WEC debut against Rafael Rebello on June 20, 2010 at WEC 49. He won the fight via unanimous decision.

Cariaso next faced Renan Barão on December 16, 2010 at WEC 53. He lost via submission in the first round.

Ultimate Fighting Championship
On October 28, 2010, World Extreme Cagefighting merged with the Ultimate Fighting Championship. As part of the merger, all WEC fighters were transferred to the UFC.

In his first UFC fight, Cariaso faced Will Campuzano on January 22, 2011 at UFC Fight Night 23. He won the fight via unanimous decision (29-28, 29-28, 29-28).

Cariaso was expected to face Norifumi Yamamoto on May 28, 2011 at UFC 130. However, Yamamoto was forced out of the bout with an injury and replaced by Michael McDonald. Cariaso lost a hard fought split decision to McDonald in a closely contested fight.

Cariaso faced UFC newcomer Vaughan Lee on November 5, 2011 at UFC 138. He won the fight via split decision.

Cariaso faced Takeya Mizugaki on February 26, 2012 at UFC 144.  Cariaso defeated Mizugaki via unanimous decision.

Cariaso decided to drop to the flyweight division where he faced Josh Ferguson at UFC on Fuel TV: Munoz vs. Weidman.  He won the fight via unanimous decision.

Cariaso fought John Moraga on December 29, 2012 at UFC 155. He was submitted in the third round with a guillotine choke.

Cariaso faced Jussier Formiga on May 18, 2013 at UFC on FX 8. He lost the fight via unanimous decision.

Cariaso next faced Iliarde Santos on October 9, 2013 at UFC Fight Night 29. He won the fight via TKO in the second round.

Cariaso was expected to face Kyoji Horiguchi on February 1, 2014 at UFC 169.  However, Horoguchi pulled out of the bout citing injury and was replaced by WEC veteran Danny Martinez. Cariaso won the fight via unanimous decision.

Cariaso faced Louis Smolka on May 10, 2014 at UFC Fight Night 40. He won the fight via split decision.

A rescheduled bout with Kyoji Horiguchi was expected to take place on September 20, 2014 at UFC Fight Night 52. However, on July 15, 2014 it was announced that Cariaso would receive a title shot against UFC Flyweight champion Demetrious Johnson in the co-main event of UFC 177. On August 12, the Johnson/Cariaso bout was moved to the main event of UFC 178. Cariaso lost the bout via submission due to a kimura in the second round.

Cariaso faced Henry Cejudo on March 14, 2015 at UFC 185. He lost the fight by unanimous decision.

Cariaso faced Sergio Pettis on October 3, 2015 at UFC 192. He lost the fight via unanimous decision.

On February 2, 2016, Cariaso announced that he is retiring from active competition.

Mixed martial arts record

|-
|Loss
|align=center|17–8
|Sergio Pettis
|Decision (unanimous)
|UFC 192
|
|align=center|3
|align=center|5:00
|Houston, Texas, United States
|
|-
| Loss
| align=center| 17–7
| Henry Cejudo
| Decision (unanimous)
| UFC 185
| 
| align=center| 3
| align=center| 5:00
| Dallas, Texas, United States
| 
|-
| Loss
| align=center| 17–6
| Demetrious Johnson
| Submission (kimura)
| UFC 178
| 
| align=center| 2
| align=center| 2:29
| Las Vegas, Nevada, United States
| 
|-
| Win
| align=center| 17–5 
| Louis Smolka
| Decision (split)
| UFC Fight Night: Brown vs. Silva
| 
| align=center| 3
| align=center| 5:00
| Cincinnati, Ohio, United States
| 
|-
|  Win
| align=center| 16–5
| Danny Martinez
| Decision (unanimous)
| UFC 169
| 
| align=center| 3
| align=center| 5:00
| Newark, New Jersey, United States
| 
|-
|  Win
| align=center| 15–5
| Iliarde Santos
| TKO (punches)
| UFC Fight Night: Maia vs. Shields
| 
| align=center| 2
| align=center| 4:31
| Barueri, Brazil
| 
|-
|  Loss 
| align=center| 14–5 
| Jussier Formiga
| Decision (unanimous)
| UFC on FX: Belfort vs. Rockhold
| 
| align=center| 3 
| align=center| 5:00
| Jaraguá do Sul, Brazil
| 
|-
|  Loss
| align=center| 14–4
| John Moraga
| Submission (guillotine choke)
| UFC 155
| 
| align=center| 3
| align=center| 1:11
| Las Vegas, Nevada, United States
| 
|-
| Win
| align=center| 14–3
| Josh Ferguson
| Decision (unanimous)
| UFC on Fuel TV: Munoz vs. Weidman
| 
| align=center| 3
| align=center| 5:00
| San Jose, California, United States
| 
|-
|  Win
| align=center| 13–3
| Takeya Mizugaki
| Decision (unanimous)
| UFC 144
| 
| align=center| 3
| align=center| 5:00
| Saitama, Japan
| 
|-
|  Win
| align=center| 12–3
| Vaughan Lee
| Decision (split)
| UFC 138
| 
| align=center| 3
| align=center| 5:00
| Birmingham, England
|
|-
|  Loss
| align=center| 11–3
| Michael McDonald
| Decision (split)
| UFC 130
| 
| align=center| 3
| align=center| 5:00
| Las Vegas, Nevada, United States
| 
|-
|  Win
| align=center| 11–2
| Will Campuzano
| Decision (unanimous)
| UFC: Fight for the Troops 2
| 
| align=center| 3
| align=center| 5:00
| Fort Hood, Texas, United States
| 
|-
|  Loss
| align=center| 10–2
| Renan Barão
| Submission (rear-naked choke)
| WEC 53
| 
| align=center| 1
| align=center| 3:47
| Glendale, Arizona, United States
| 
|-
|  Win
| align=center| 10–1
| Rafael Rebello
| Decision (unanimous)
| WEC 49
| 
| align=center| 3
| align=center| 5:00
| Edmonton, Alberta, Canada
| 
|-
|  Win
| align=center| 9–1
| Rolando Velasco
| TKO (punches)
| LTD: Rumble in Richmond
| 
| align=center| 2
| align=center| 3:17
| Richmond, California, United States
| 
|-
| Win
| align=center| 8–1
| Alvin Cacdac
| Submission (rear-naked choke)
| WCSC: The Awakening
| 
| align=center| 1
| align=center| 3:56
| San Francisco, California, United States
| 
|-
| Win
| align=center| 7–1
| Anthony Figueroa
| Submission (rear-naked choke)
| Strikeforce: Melendez vs. Thomson
| 
| align=center| 2
| align=center| 4:34
| San Jose, California, United States
| 
|-
| Loss
| align=center| 6–1
| Mark Oshiro
| TKO (punches)
| ShoXC: Elite Challenger Series
| 
| align=center| 1
| align=center| 2:38
| Friant, California, United States
| 
|-
| Win
| align=center| 6–0
| Rick McCorkell
| Decision (unanimous)
| ShoXC: Elite Challenger Series
| 
| align=center| 3
| align=center| 5:00
| Santa Ynez, California, United States
| 
|-
| Win
| align=center| 5–0
| Anthony Figueroa
| Decision (unanimous)
| Strikeforce: Shamrock vs. Baroni
| 
| align=center| 3
| align=center| 3:00
| San Jose, California, United States
| 
|-
| Win
| align=center| 4–0
| David Barrios
| KO (head kick)
| CCFC: Total Elimination
| 
| align=center| 2
| align=center| 1:34
| Santa Rosa, California, United States
| 
|-
| Win
| align=center| 3–0
| Andrew Valladerez
| Decision (unanimous)
| Strikeforce: Young Guns
| 
| align=center| 3
| align=center| 3:00
| San Jose, California, United States
| 
|-
| Win
| align=center| 2–0
| Walt Hughes
| Decision (unanimous)
| Warrior Cup 1
| 
| align=center| 3
| align=center| 5:00
| Stockton, California, United States
| 
|-
| Win
| align=center| 1–0
| Ralph Alvarado
| Decision (unanimous)
| ICFO 1: Stockton
| 
| align=center| 3
| align=center| 5:00
| Stockton, California, United States
|

See also
 List of current UFC fighters
 List of male mixed martial artists

References

External links

Official UFC Profile

Living people
American male mixed martial artists
American mixed martial artists of Filipino descent
Mixed martial artists from California
Bantamweight mixed martial artists
Flyweight mixed martial artists
Mixed martial artists utilizing Brazilian jiu-jitsu
American practitioners of Brazilian jiu-jitsu
People awarded a black belt in Brazilian jiu-jitsu
1981 births
Ultimate Fighting Championship male fighters